Lin-ay sang Negros 2019, the 25th edition of the annual Lin-ay sang Negros was held on April 12, 2019, at the Pana-ad Park and Stadium. A total of 26 candidates from 12 cities and 14 municipalities sent their representatives. Talisay City's Roxanne Toleco was crowned by Danice Decolongon Lin-ay sang Negros 2018 winner from the municipality of Ilog  at the end of the event.

Final Results

* - She also automatically competed in Eat Bulaga's Miss Millennial Philippines 2019.

Special Awards

Contestants

Performances

Kristofer Martin

Panel of Judges

Jojo Bragais- Designer
Maureen Wroblewitz - Asia's Next Top Model Winner
Tom Ramos
Cathrene Stanzon
Ryan Agoncillo - Actor
Maria Lopez -  Lin-ay sang Negros 1994 Winner

References

Beauty pageants in the Philippines
Culture of Negros Occidental
2019 beauty pageants
April 2019 events in the Philippines